Pethidine intermediate A is a 4-phenylpiperidine derivative that is a precursor to the opioid analgesic drug pethidine (meperidine). It is not known to have any analgesic activity in its own right, however other derivatives of pethidine with a 4-cyano group in place of the carboxylate ethyl ester have been found to be active, so pethidine intermediate A might also show opioid effects. It is scheduled by UN Single Convention on Narcotic Drugs. It is a Schedule II Narcotic controlled substance in the United States and has an ACSCN of 9232.  The 2014 annual manufacturing quota was 6 grammes (as an end product, presumably for research use).

See also 
 Moramide intermediate
 Methadone intermediate
 Pethidine intermediate B (norpethidine)
 Pethidine intermediate C (pethidinic acid)

References 

Synthetic opioids
4-Phenylpiperidines
Nitriles